Frederick Monhoff (November 23, 1897 – October 11, 1975) was an American architect, artist, and illustrator. His architectural style ranged from art deco to mid-century modern, while his etchings of the 1920s-30s documented scenes of Native American and Mexican life in the American Southwest.

Early life and family
Frederick Monhoff was born in New York City to Emil Monhoff (1865-1922) and Maria Therese Kremer Monhoff (1864-1951). As a boy, Monhoff moved to Los Angeles with his family. He served in the United States Navy during World War I and later attended the University of California, Berkeley where he received an M.A. in 1921. At Berkeley, Monhoff served on the staff of the school's literary journal The Occident.

On June 29, 1926, Monhoff married Hildegarde Flanner and they settled in Altadena, California. Monhoff illustrated several of Flanner's books of poetry and essays with his drawings and etchings. The couple had one child, John, born March 15, 1941. Hildegarde's sister was Janet Flanner, a long time Paris correspondent for The New Yorker, (writing under the pen name Genet). In 1962, Monhoff and his family moved north to Calistoga, California, in the Napa Valley and he died there in 1975.

Career
Monhoff served as a design architect for the Los Angeles County Architectural Divisions and designed numerous public buildings and private residences in Southern California in the Los Angeles area, Malibu, Santa Barbara, Palm Springs, Orange County, and in Northern California in the Napa Valley. Monhoff taught design at the Otis Art Institute in Los Angeles (1926-1950) and at the Pasadena Art Institute (1959).  During the 1940s, he also taught architecture at the University of California, Los Angeles (UCLA).

In 1924, the International Printmakers Society of California awarded Monhoff a bronze medal for Best Print or Best Series of Prints. Monhoff's etching Clothes Burning Ceremony is listed in the Art Institute of Chicago's 1932 exhibition catalog First International Exhibition of Etching and Engraving. In early 2000, Monhoff's work was featured in the Sweet Briar College gallery exhibition, White to Blue: American Art as Reflection of Social Class in the 20th Century.  The Frederick Monhoff Memorial Prize and The Frederick Monhoff Printing Lab at Otis College of Art and Design in Los Angeles, California are named in his honor.

Collections of Monhoff's archived papers, architectural plans, and art work are held at University of California, Los Angeles (UCLA), the De Young Museum in San Francisco and the Smithsonian American Art Museum in Washington, D.C.

Major works

Buildings
 3450 Ben Lomond Place Los Feliz Knolls, Los Angeles, California (1927)
 822 North Roxbury Drive Beverly Hills, California (1928)
 Biltmore Hotel Palm Springs, California (1948; demolished in 2003)
 110 Anita Drive Pasadena, California (1948)
 3101 Clarmeya Lane Pasadena, California (1948)
 1975 Micheltorena Street Silver Lake, Los Angeles, California (1950)
 630 Georgina Ave., Santa Monica, California (1950)
 420 7th St. Santa Monica, California (1951)

Etchings
 Indian and Mexican Traders, Santa Cruz, New Mexico, the de Young Museum, San Francisco, California
Marriage Ceremony, Santa Clara, New Mexico, the de Young Museum, San Francisco, California 
 Old Church, Zuni, New Mexico, the de Young Museum, San Francisco, California
 Penitent Motive , The Harwood Museum of Art, Taos, New Mexico
 Penitente Ceremony, Nambe, New Mexico, the de Young Museum, San Francisco, California
 Procession of St. Mary, Santa Fe, New Mexico, the de Young Museum, San Francisco, California 
 Worshippers at Cathedral, Santa Fe, New Mexico, the de Young Museum, San Francisco, California

Illustrations
 Time's Profile, by Hildegarde Flanner with illustrations by Frederick Monhoff, first published by Macmillan Company (1929)
 Valley Quail, by Hildegarde Flanner with illustrations by Frederick Monhoff, first published by The Ward Ritchie Press (1929)
 In Native Light, by Hildegarde Flanner with illustrations by Frederick Monhoff, first published by James E. Beard (1970)
 [https://www.amazon.com/A-vanishing-land-Hildegarde-Flanner/dp/0931832152 A Vanishing Land']', by Hildegarde Flanner with illustrations by Frederick Monhoff, first published by No Dead Lines (1980)
 Brief Cherishing: A Napa Valley Harvest, by Hildegarde Flanner with illustrations by Frederick Monhoff, first published by John Daniel and Co. (1985)

References
 Frederick Monhoff Papers, 1922-1970 Department of Special Collections, Charles E. Young Research Library, University of California, Los Angeles
 Smithsonian American Art Museum Collection
 The Blue and Gold yearbook of University of California, Berkeley (1920)
 Who's Who in California, 1942-1943 R. H. Fletcher, Editor. Published by Who's Who Publications Co. (1943)
 Motels, Hotels. Restaurants and Bars: An Architectural Record Book''. James Hornbeck, Editor. Published by F.W. Dodge Corporation (1953)
 Manas Journal (1986)
 Sweet Briar College, "White to Blue: American Art as Reflection of Social Class in the 20th Century." (2000)
 The Palm Springs Modern Committee: Lost Buildings Palm Springs, California (2003)
 Biltmore Hotel Postcards (2006)
 Teardown Debate Close to Home The Desert Sun, Palm Springs, California (January 28, 2007) 
 Palm Springs Modernism Timeline Palm Springs Life, Palm Springs, California (February 2007)
 That's Rather Lovely: 1920s Home in Los Feliz Knolls NBC Los Angeles, Los Angeles, California (July 29, 2009)
 Palm Springs Biltmore Resort  Palm Springs Preservation Foundation
 Foundations of Los Angeles Modernism: Richard Neutra's Mod Squad Southern California Architectural History (August 26, 2010)
 Richard Neutra and the California Art Club Southern California Architectural History (May 16, 2011)

1897 births
1975 deaths
20th-century American architects
Modernist architects
Altadena, California
People from Altadena, California
People from Calistoga, California
United States Navy personnel of World War I